Dan Peter Stråhed (born 12 June 1956) is a Swedish singer, songwriter and musician who was the lead singer of Wizex for thirteen years. In 1981, he started the band  ("Angel children"), who released one music album and was the pre-show act for Queen during their Scandinavian tour.

He participated in Melodifestivalen 2022 with the song  "Hallabaloo".

Discography

Singles

References

External links 

 
 
 

1956 births
Living people
20th-century Swedish guitarists
20th-century Swedish singers
21st-century Swedish guitarists
21st-century Swedish singers
Swedish male guitarists
Swedish male singers
Swedish male singer-songwriters
Swedish multi-instrumentalists
Swedish pop guitarists
Swedish pop singers
Musicians from Malmö
Parlophone artists
People from Kirseberg
Singers from Malmö
Melodifestivalen contestants of 2022